Senator Mather may refer to:

Hiram F. Mather (1796–1868), New York State Senate
John C. Mather (New York politician) (1813–1882), New York State Senate
John Perkins Cushing Mather (1816–1891), Connecticut State Senate

See also
Tim Mathern (born 1950), North Dakota State Senate